Music for Cougars is Sugar Ray's sixth studio album. The album was not as successful commercially as previous Sugar Ray albums. It reached number eighty on the Billboard 200 chart, with none of the album's three singles charting. This was the last album to feature turntablist Craig "DJ Homicide" Bullock, bassist Murphy Karges and drummer Stan Frazier before their departures in August 2010 and early 2012, respectively.

Reception
Stephen Thomas Erlewine of AllMusic gave the album three-and-half out of five stars. He noted its heavy usage of autotune, and wrote "they make no bones about making Music for Cougars, those cougars being the very girls that shook their hips to 'Fly' back in 1997 and are looking for a little bit of the same breezy vibe 12 years later, a little bit of sexy nostalgia to get them through their summer, a soundtrack to a few girls' nights out." Billboard claimed that it "marks a return to the tried-and-true formula that made 1997's 'Fly' a radio staple."

Track listing
 "Girls Were Made to Love" (Featuring Collie Buddz) (Includes a sample from Eddie Hodges, "(Girls, Girls, Girls) Made to Love", 1962) – 3:38
 "Boardwalk" – 3:26
 "She's Got The (Woo-Hoo)" – 3:35
 "Love Is the Answer" (Cover of a previously unreleased Weezer track, written by and featuring Rivers Cuomo. Later reworked and re-recorded for Weezer's Raditude) – 3:57
 "Rainbow" – 3:17
 "Closer" – 3:33
 "When We Were Young" – 3:21
 "Going Nowhere" – 2:49
 "Love 101" – 3:17
 "Last Days" – 3:33
 "Morning Sun" – 3:44
 "Dance Like No One's Watchin'" (Featuring Donavon Frankenreiter) – 3:53

References

External links

Sugar Ray albums
2009 albums
Albums produced by Josh Abraham